Jane Hanson (born December 9, 1955) formerly co-hosted New York Live (formerly called LX New York) on NBC-TV in New York. She joined WNBC-TV in September 1979. She hosted Jane Hanson's New York on WNBC-TV. She became host in 2003 after serving as co-anchor of Today in New York from 1988 to 2003. She left WNBC on November 15, 2006.

She has won nine Emmy Awards, having begun as an anchor and correspondent for WNBC New York in 1979. In 1988, she became co-anchor of Today in New York, a position she held until 2003 when she became the station's primary anchor for local programming and the host of Jane's New York.

Hanson has served as a fill-in newsreader on The Today Show for John Palmer, Deborah Norville, Faith Daniels, Margaret Larson, Matt Lauer, and Ann Curry from 1988 to 2003. In May 2007, AnswersMedia announced that Hanson was joining HealthAnswersTV as host of the video series The Answered Patient. She returned to WNBC on February 15, 2010 as co-host, with Sara Gore, of its then 5 pm newscast LX New York, as it was then known.

Hanson is a former president of the New York chapter of the National Academy of Television Arts and Sciences. She lives with her husband and daughter on Long Island.

References

External links
WNBC TV
BroadcastingCable.com article

American women television journalists
New York (state) television reporters
Television anchors from New York City
Place of birth missing (living people)
1955 births
Living people
21st-century American women